The Ministry of Agrarian Development and Family Agriculture (abbreviated MDA) is a cabinet-level federal ministry in Brazil.

The MDA was established in 1999 to oversee land reform in Brazil and promote sustainable practices. The agency oversees the Center for Agrarian Studies and Rural Development (NEAD) and the National Institute for Colonization and Agrarian Reform (Incra). After taking office as Acting President, Michel Temer fused the ministry with the Ministry of Social Development. It was later recomposed by president Luiz Inácio Lula da Silva in 2023. The incumbent minister is Paulo Teixeira.

See also
 Ministry of Fishing and Aquaculture
 Ministry of Agriculture (Brazil)

References

External links
 Official site

Agrarian Development
Brazil
Brazil, Agrarian Development
1999 establishments in Brazil
Agricultural organisations based in Brazil